La Rosita is a census-designated place (CDP) in Starr County, Texas, United States. The population was 85 at the 2010 census down from 1,729 at the 2000 census. This is because the Census Bureau redefined the CDP.

Geography
La Rosita is located at  (26.401682, -98.932100).

Prior to the 2010 census, La Rosita CDP gained area, had parts taken to form new CDPs, and lost additional area. As a result, the total area was reduced to 0.1 square miles (0.3 km), all land.

Demographics
At the 2000 census there were 1,729 people, 435 households, and 394 families in the CDP. The population density was 538.3 people per square mile (208.0/km). There were 537 housing units at an average density of 167.2/sq mi (64.6/km).  The racial makeup of the CDP was 94.68% White, 4.68% from other races, and 0.64% from two or more races. Hispanic or Latino of any race were 99.25%.

Of the 435 households 65.3% had children under the age of 18 living with them, 71.7% were married couples living together, 15.9% had a female householder with no husband present, and 9.4% were non-families. 9.0% of households were one person and 4.6% were one person aged 65 or older. The average household size was 3.97 and the average family size was 4.23.

The age distribution was 41.7% under the age of 18, 11.0% from 18 to 24, 27.3% from 25 to 44, 14.3% from 45 to 64, and 5.7% 65 or older. The median age was 24 years. For every 100 females, there were 100.3 males. For every 100 females age 18 and over, there were 90.9 males.

The median household income was $12,864 and the median family income  was $13,125. Males had a median income of $12,273 versus $10,268 for females. The per capita income for the CDP was $4,228. About 60.3% of families and 58.1% of the population were below the poverty line, including 68.8% of those under age 18 and 33.3% of those age 65 or over.

Government and infrastructure
The La Rosita Fire Department station is adjacent to the 2010-2020 La Rosita CDP, and within the former 2000 La Rosita CDP.

Education
Public education in the community of La Rosita is provided by the Roma Independent School District. The zoned elementary school is Delia Gonzalez (DG) Garcia Elementary School, which is adjacent to the 2010-2020 CDP, and within the former 2000 CDP.

Zoned campuses in 2009-2010 included Anna S. Canavan Elementary School (pre-kindergarten), R.T. Barrera Elementary School (grades K-5), Ramiro Barrera Middle School (grades 6-8), and Roma High School  (grades 9-12).

References

Census-designated places in Starr County, Texas
Census-designated places in Texas